Melita is a feminine given name which may refer to:

 Melita Aitken (1866–1945), Canadian painter and writer
 Melita Gordon, gastroenterologist
 Melita Maschmann (1918–2010), German memoirist
 Melita Norwood (1912–2005), British civil servant and Soviet spy
 Melita Ruhn (born 1965), Romanian retired gymnast
 Melita Švob (born 1931), Croatian Jewish biologist and historian
 Melita Vovk (born 1928), Slovene painter and illustrator of children's books

Feminine given names